Robina Parkway (state route 7) is a major road on the Gold Coast, Queensland. The road begins at the overpass of the Pacific Motorway and travels through the suburb of Robina before termination in Carrara at the intersection with Gooding Drive (state route 50) and Nerang - Broadbeach Road (state route 90).

Major intersections
The entire road is in the Gold Coast local government area.

See also

References

Roads on the Gold Coast, Queensland